XHRC-FM is a radio station on 91.7 FM in Puebla, Puebla, Mexico. The station is owned by Grupo ACIR and carries the Mix adult contemporary format.

History
XHRC received its first concession on January 19, 1982. It was owned by Juan Baptista Campo Rodríguez and sold to ACIR in 1993.

References

1982 establishments in Mexico
Grupo ACIR
Mass media in Puebla (city)
Radio stations established in 1982
Radio stations in Puebla
Spanish-language radio stations